The Umineko When They Cry visual novel series features an extensive cast of characters created and originally illustrated by 07th Expansion's Ryukishi07. The series takes place on the fictional secluded island Rokkenjima in Japan, and the storyline primarily follows the Ushiromiya family during the time period of October 4 and October 5, 1986. Kinzo, the head of the wealthy Ushiromiya family, owns and resides on Rokkenjima. Kinzo is near death, and eight of his family members arrive on the island for the annual family conference, where the adults plan to discuss how Kinzo's assets will be divided once he is dead. Also on the island are three family members who live there, five of Kinzo's servants, and his personal physician, for a total of 18 people. After the eight family members arrive, a typhoon traps them on the island, and shortly after, strange things start to happen and people start dying.

Real world characters

Ushiromiya family
Rokkenjima is owned by the wealthy Ushiromiya family and serves as the home of the family head. The family was initially much greater and contained more members until the 1923 Great Kantō earthquake, after which the family was severely crippled, both domestically and financially. The current head, Kinzo, was originally part of a smaller branch of the family, and it fell to him to restore the family's glory. In Umineko, there is a rumor that Kinzo turned to the Golden Witch Beatrice and sold his soul for ¥20 billion worth of gold, allowing the Ushiromiya family to prosper more than it ever had before.

The current members of the Ushiromiya family gather on Rokkenjima every year for their annual family conference. While the youngest members of the family, Kinzo's grandchildren, see it as a chance to bond and have a pleasurable time chatting about their lives, their parents, Kinzo's children, take the opportunity to debate how Kinzo's assets are to be divided after his death. After that comes to pass, the headship will be passed down onto a successor according to a preset hierarchy. As the current head, Kinzo holds the highest rank of all the family members. Following Kinzo are his four children, from oldest to youngest (first son Krauss, first daughter Eva, second son Rudolf, and second daughter Rosa), then his grandchildren in order of their parents' age (Krauss' daughter Jessica, Eva's son George, Rudolf's son Battler, and Rosa's daughter Maria), and finally his children's spouses as they are not blood relatives (Krauss' wife Natsuhi, Eva's husband Hideyoshi, and Rudolf's wife Kyrie).

Kinzo's descendants have a Western naming style. While foreign names are normally written in katakana, the names of Kinzo's children and grandchildren are written using similar-sounding kanji.

Family heads
 
	
Kinzo is the elderly head of the Ushiromiya family and the owner of Rokkenjima. Throughout the first four games, Kinzo's body frequently turns up burnt in the incinerator of the mansion's underground boiler room as a means to conceal how long he had been dead, and is identified as Kinzo due to his polydactyly, distinguished by having six toes on each foot. In life, Kinzo held his children in contempt, viewing them as vultures ready to feast on his inheritance as soon as he died. He would rarely leave his large study, which contains various commodities such as a bed and bathroom. He was also a rabid practitioner of black magic and the occult, his shelves lined with volumes of grimoires. One of his most prominent obsessions was Beatrice, a witch he is said to have summoned and contracted for ten tons worth of gold.

Sayo, also known as "Yasu" (ヤス), shortened from "Yasuda" (安田), is the true human identity of Beatrice. She is the secret family head of the Ushiromiya family, who took over after Kinzo's death in 1984. Her birth name is Lion Ushiromiya, but she was given the name Sayo Yasuda by Genji in an effort to hide her real identity. Sayo is a child born from the incest between Kinzo and his daughter Beatrice Ushiromiya, making Sayo both Kinzo's child and grandchild. Sayo's birth sex is kept hidden throughout the game but is later implied to be male. Her true last name was only revealed in Requiem of the Golden Witch, while her first name, Sayo is revealed in Legend of the Golden Witch. When Lion was still a baby, the servant carrying "him" was pushed off a cliff by Natsuhi, resulting in the servant's death and the mutilation of Lion's abdominal area and sexual organs. Fortunately Genji managed to save "his" life with Nanjo's help, but afterwards Lion was raised as a girl in the Fukuin House under the name "Sayo Yasuda" to avoid Natsuhi's suspicions regarding her true identity. It was said that Genji had to hide Sayo, who was "now a girl", from another potential incestuous advance by Kinzo. Sayo has since been living on Rokkenjima, disguised as the servants "Shannon" and "Kanon". Her full appearance is only revealed in the manga.

First generation descendants
Kinzo's immediate children and potential heirs to his fortune.

Kinzo's first child and eldest son. He is the current heir of the Ushiromiya family, and leads the family conference on Kinzo's behalf. He is a real estate investor and plans to turn Rokkenjima into a resort, but has wasted most of his funds. He thus hides Kinzo's death from his younger siblings in an attempt to monopolize Kinzo's fortune. His daughter, Jessica, also has little respect for him, particularly due to the pressure he places on her to become a suitable successor to the Ushiromiya family after him. Despite always swaggering about, Krauss holds genuine remorse for all the troubles he put his family through. He is known to have taken up boxing in his youth, and still possesses quite a bit of skill in that area. Unlike his siblings, he lives on Rokkenjima with his father, wife, and daughter.

Kinzo's second child and eldest daughter. Eva is hostile towards her older brother Krauss out of discontent for her family's patriarchal tradition, which places her in a position inferior to her brother in the family hierarchy. She rallies her younger siblings against Krauss to try and extort money out of him, though with limited success. She is skilled in various forms of martial arts, and is said to be excellent at cooking. Under normal circumstances, Eva would have been out of the family register upon marrying her husband, Hideyoshi. She gave birth before Krauss and raised her son George strictly so he could become the head of the family. She is also condescending towards Natsuhi for not being related to the Ushiromiya family by blood, and acts cruelly towards Shannon, who she suspects of being George's lover. Despite her insidious personality, however, she treasures her husband and son dearly and fears that they dislike her for using them out of revenge towards her brother.

Rudolf is Kinzo's third child. He was known as a philanderer in his youth and had impregnated his business partner and old girlfriend Kyrie before he married his first wife Asumu. After Asumu's death, he immediately remarried with Kyrie, leading to a falling out with his son Battler (who believed Asumu to have been his mother), who ran away from home to his maternal grandparents for six years. Rudolf is still known to chat up young women from time to time, though this does not seem to disturb Kyrie. He seeks Kinzo's fortune to settle a court case in America. He is an avid lover of Western films and an impressive marksman.

Rosa is Kinzo's fourth child. As the youngest of her siblings, she has the least influence at the family conference. Her husband abandoned her shortly before the birth of her daughter and only child, Maria. Rosa is the president of a small design company, "Anti-Rosa", and thus seeks out Kinzo's inheritance to pay off her co-endorsers. On the surface, Rosa appears to be the most sensible and soothing of all the siblings. However, as a result of being downtrodden by her older siblings in her childhood and forced to endure the pressures of a single mother, she frequently loses control of her emotions and responds violently to her daughter's childish behavior and overenthusiastic approach to the occult. Her relationship with Maria is complicated by how she does not spend enough time with her daughter. Though Maria knows her mother's behavior, she also suspects that Rosa resents her. Her former relationship with Maria's father was once happy, and the two had signed a co-endorsed loan which would later on cause financial problems for him. As a result he left when Rosa became pregnant, saddling her with both Maria and a large debt. Despite the things he's done, Rosa believes that once she has paid off her debt that he will come back to her and become a proper father to Maria.

First descendants' spouses

Krauss' wife. Born into a family of Shinto priests, Natsuhi discarded her old life when she married into the Ushiromiya family. She is a very proud woman who holds her new family's name in high regard, and is in charge of managing the family head house and family conferences. However, her efforts are undervalued by her husband, and she is often afflicted with headaches. She holds a bitter rivalry with Eva, who mocks her for not being related to the Ushiromiya family by blood. She is also incredibly strict towards her daughter Jessica, but only out of concern that she becomes an ideal heiress to the Ushiromiya family.

Eva's husband. Hideyoshi is a very jovial man whose cheerful nature manages to tone down the tension between the siblings during their various meetings. Having lost his family in World War II, he willingly adopted the name "Ushiromiya" when he married Eva. He is the successful president of a chain of fast food restaurants, but seeks Kinzo's fortune due to people trying to buy all the shares in his company. He speaks with a fake Kansai accent (US Southern accent in the English translation), which he is said to be too embarrassed to use against actual people from the Kansai region of Japan.

Kyrie is Rudolf's second wife. She is also one of Rudolf's business partners, always assisting him in shady dealings and keeping him in line when he gets out of hand. Kyrie and Battler have bonded more as close friends with a sibling-like relationship rather than mother and son. She has a "flip the chessboard" mentality to work out mental problems, and influences Battler in this regard. She had dated Rudolf long before his first wife Asumu, who she envied for marrying Rudolf while she was still going out with him.

Second generation descendants

Krauss and Natsuhi's 18-year-old daughter. Although Jessica is the heiress of the Ushiromiya family after her father, she is an energetic and tomboyish young woman who lacks the more refined behavior expected of such a role. Due to her rebellious nature, she is resentful of her parents for the pressures they place on her regarding the family headship, but still shows concern for them. She has a habit of faking asthma attacks as a means of escaping from tense situations. She has a crush on the servant Kanon, which is reciprocated to some extent. She is also proficient in the use of brass knuckles thanks to her father training her in Boxing.

Eva and Hideyoshi's 23-year-old son. He is the oldest of Kinzo's grandchildren, and an exceptional and diligent young adult. He was brought up by Eva specifically with the family headship in mind, works at his father's company as an apprentice, and is a skilled martial artist like his mother. He respects his parents greatly, though he admittedly finds his mother overbearing. He is in love with the servant Shannon and proposes to her, making him her fiancé. Believing that his romance with a servant would be frowned upon by his family, however, he is fully willing and prepared to face the consequences.

George is admired by everyone in his family, especially his cousins, who view him as their older brother and peacemaker. In his youth, however, he had been jealous of their more independent and impulsive lifestyles, particularly Battler, as unlike him, his mother made him do various things in his youth in order to shape him into the next head. As a result, he put up a more condescending mask towards his cousins, but has since outgrown this inferiority complex to a certain degree.

Battler is Rudolf's 18-year-old son, and the main protagonist of the first four games of the series. Although stubborn and hotheaded, he is a very compassionate young man. He tends to flirt with young women and has a perpetual fear of "shaky" transportation, thinking he may fall out of a plane or boat depending on the turbulence. Due to his father's remarriage, Battler rebelled and went to live with his maternal grandparents for the next six years, cutting all ties to the Ushiromiya family. After his grandparents' deaths, he returned to his family, though he had not fully reconciled with his father. He is greatly influenced by Kyrie's "flip the chessboard" mindset, which allows him to predict his enemies' thoughts based on the situation at hand. He has a habit of saying  when in a difficult situation. One of the main themes of the series is Battler's disbelief in the existence of witches and magic when his family and friends are murdered in the mysterious ways. Though he is convinced that the culprit is human, he is reluctant to suspect his loved ones as the culprits.
    

Maria is Rosa's nine-year-old daughter. She has a long-standing habit of uttering  whenever excited or upset. She is very honest and naïve, as shown by her tendency to easily believe lies and take jokes very seriously. While she loves her mother, Maria subconsciously resents that Rosa's long and frequent absences have made her lonely and wishes Rosa would spend more time with her. Having no interest in friends or studies, Maria has an extensive knowledge of the occult. There have been instances, usually when Beatrice or the occult is involved, where she acts very creepy. She believes avidly in Beatrice's existence, and gets mad at anyone who questions it; she even claims to have met and played with Beatrice on multiple occasions. Her interest in the occult and black magic is shared with Kinzo.

Ange is Rudolf and Kyrie's six-year-old daughter, and Battler's sister. She could not come to the island in 1986 due to sickness.

House guests
Guests who were present at the annual family meeting of the Ushiromiya family held on October 4 and October 5, 1986.

Nanjo is Kinzo's personal physician and close friend. He is also Kinzo's opponent in chess. He is one of the few people Kinzo, who has grown fanatical in his suspicions, opens his heart to. He has a bighearted disposition, and has come to the island for a long time, never getting upset by Kinzo's hot temper. He owned a clinic on Niijima, the island closest to Rokkenjima, but he resigned in favor of his son Masayuki.

Erika is a young detective introduced in End of the Golden Witch. A blue-haired girl estimated to be around the age of a middle school student, she is characterized as being highly intelligent and possessing an excellent memory. She acts very polite in public, and shows an extreme interest in puzzles and mysteries. In truth, she is ruthless and cunning, and only solves mysteries to boast her superiority towards those who execute them. She does, however, possess a serious inferiority complex, and is prone to breaking down emotionally whenever things do not go her way. Erika had been presumed lost at sea after falling off of a boat near Rokkenjima around the time of the murders. By the time public interest about Erika's fate arose, she was written into the stories of End and Dawn of the Golden Witch as having washed up on the shores of Rokkenjima and being taken in by the Ushiromiya family as a guest. Her name is strikingly similar to Rika Furude's from Higurashi no Naku Koro ni.

Servants
The Ushiromiya head house is tended to by multiple servants. While there are more, only five servants are on duty at the time of the murders on Rokkenjima. 

Genji is the head butler of Kinzo's mansion. He is said by Beatrice to be the first furniture Kinzo ever created, and is the person Kinzo trusts the most. While it is shown very briefly, Genji is very skilled with knives.

Shannon is a young maid of Kinzo's mansion. She has a habit of making mistakes and blunders when she is nervous, despite being an extremely talented and hardworking servant. She thinks of Kanon as her younger brother, and like him, she feels she is inferior to humans, as she is only furniture.

Kanon is a young servant of Kinzo's mansion. He is a serious and fervent servant, carrying out his master's orders thoroughly. He is a bit frail and antisocial. He considers Shannon as an older sister and highly disapproves of her feelings for George, as he believes she should not feel love as she is only furniture. Hypocritically though, he has feelings for Jessica, which he tries to hide from even himself, because he thinks of himself as "furniture", rather than a human being.

Gohda is the head cook of Kinzo's mansion. Unlike the other servants in the mansion, he had been hired by Krauss and Natsuhi. Due to this, his rank is very low. He is extremely proud of his culinary skills. He was previously employed at a hotel, and due to his experience, he is ostentatious and looks down upon Shannon and Kanon, meanwhile, he is actually quite concerned for them, and is very reliable when it counts.

Kumasawa is a part-time worker who assists with domestic chores in Kinzo's mansion. She often shirks her responsibilities and likes to tell stories and jokes, especially outrageous ones involving mackerel.

Other servants
Former and absents servants that were not present on the Rokkenjima Murders.

An arrogant servant that was close to Krauss and Natsuhi, cleaning Krauss's study and the main stairs, seeing herself as superior as Shannon despite her lower rank. She was a bully to Shannon.

An envious servant that was jealous due to "Shannon's special treatment and hierarchy" among the servants.  She was a bully to Shannon.

A wrathful servant that use to yell at Shannon all the time due to their clumsiness. She was a bully to Shannon.

A sloth servant that use being mean to Shannon due to her being more of a hard worker than her. She was a bully to Shannon.

 
A greedy servant that became the only friend of Shannon, due to them having the same interests and tastes and for both to being hard workers. She was also a friend of Jessica.

A young servant that used to have hunger all the time but was a hard worker like Manon. She respected Shannon but didn't understand why she was higher than her despite "being younger" than her, being jealous of her in secret.

A young servant that used to fall in love all the time, specially with Kanon. She respected Shannon but didn't understand why she was higher than her despite "being younger" than her, being jealous of her in secret.

World of 1998
Characters introduced in Alliance of the Golden Witch, in the world of Ange Ushiromiya's future.

Amakusa is a hot-blooded and open young man who cannot stand boredom and is hired by Okonogi as Ange's bodyguard. He stands by Ange's side despite being originally hired by Eva, who grew to resent Ange. Due to his talkative nature, Eva fired him before her death. He is skilled at operating many weapons.

Okonogi is the president of a company who has ties with Rudolf's and Hideyoshi's companies. Ange goes to question him about everything he knows of the Rokkenjima murders, despite suspecting that he may betray her. Although he had been hired by the Sumadera family to stall Ange and allow them to take control of her wealth, he proves himself to be Ange's fundamental ally in the end and allows her to escape, hiring Amakusa to protect her. He influences Ange greatly in her battle against Beatrice, particularly his belief that truth can only be obtained through love. He is identical in appearance to the Higurashi no Naku Koro ni character Okonogi, though their personalities differ slightly.

Kasumi is the daughter of the struggling Sumadera family, and Kyrie's younger sister. Since Kyrie was the original heiress to the Sumadera family, Kasumi spent her life like a spoiled princess. However, since Kyrie cut all ties to her family when she married into the Ushiromiya family, Kasumi was forced to take up the responsibility as the Sumadera heiress. Kasumi thus blames Kyrie for all the pressures she must now face, and loathes everything about her, including her daughter Ange. She is much more open and charitable than Kyrie, though not even that can mask her malicious envy. In 1998, Kasumi participates in a feud within the Sumadera family over who will control the vast wealth Ange holds as the head of the Ushiromiya family, hunting down Ange in the additional hopes that killing her will finally alleviate some of her hatred towards the deceased Kyrie.

Masayuki is the son of Terumasa Nanjo who succeeded his father as head physician of a clinic on Niijima. Due to his family's sensitivity to Terumasa's death, Masayuki is resentful of the media for its rather flippant depiction of the murder incident on Rokkenjima, and prefers to keep quiet about it. He is interrogated by Ange during her own investigation of the incident, and only opens up to her as a fellow victim who lost her family.

Sabakichi is one of Chiyo Kumasawa's sons who works as a fisherman on Niijima. Like his mother, he is bighearted and carefree. Sabakichi is one of the relatives of the Rokkenjima murder incident's victims who Ange interrogates during her investigation.

Ootsuki is the foremost Japanese member of the Witch Hunt, an international organization of occult enthusiasts dedicated to researching the tragedy on Rokkenjima from a magical perspective. However, their presence and activities are less than welcome by the surviving family members of the victims on Rokkenjima, since they stirred up the tabloids in an unpleasant light. The name of this organization was borrowed from the English fan translation group for the game, also called "Witch Hunt".

Kawabata is the captain of a high-speed boat that sends the Ushiromiya family to Rokkenjima back and forth. After the murder incident on Rokkenjima, Kawabata held himself partially responsible for being unable to pick up the family sooner, in spite of the typhoon that otherwise prevented him from doing so. In 1998, he agrees to bring Ange to Rokkenjima in the hopes of finding closure.

Introduced in Dawn of the Golden Witch under the name , Ikuko is a mystery novelist who fabricated stories about the Rokkenjima murders based on the contradicting stories of Legend and Turn of the Golden Witch, which were written in notebook fragments found in two separate wine bottles after the tragedy occurred.

"Toya Hachijo" is the name given to Battler Ushiromiya after he is found alive by Ikuko Hachijo after the Rokkenjima incident. He suffers from amnesia and remembers nothing about himself other than that he was 18 years old at the time of his rescue.

Other human characters

Asumu is Rudolf's first wife and Battler's mother, who had died six years prior to the start of the series. She never appears directly in the story, but is mentioned frequently in the game's dialogue and tips. She is said by Kyrie to have butted in on her relationship with Rudolf and forced him to marry her. Upon her death, Rudolf immediately remarried with Kyrie, leading Battler to believe that Rudolf had betrayed Asumu and he cut his ties to the Ushiromiya family for the next six years.

Beatrice is Kinzo's lover, the daughter of an Italian Social Republic official, and mother of the Beatrice who would later become the basis of the legend of the Golden Witch. She is called  for short. She went to Rokkenjima, which hid a secret Japanese base at the time, together with her father in the Navy, who died on the voyage.

Beatrice was the daughter of Kinzo and Beatrice Castiglioni, alas never recognized as such, as Kinzo was convinced she was the reincarnation of his deceased lover. Kinzo kept Beatrice living in the hidden mansion of Kuwadorian where she was raised by Kumasawa, and was told to never leave the house limits as there were wolves outside its gates. As she grew older, her appearance was strikingly similar to that of her dead mother, although she never understood who she really was. As Kinzo vehemently believed she was the reincarnation of Beatrice, he eventually began an incestuous relationship with her, which resulted in the birth of Sayo/Lion.

Lion is a member of the Ushiromiya family who exists only within the alternate world shown in Requiem of the Golden Witch as a result of Natsuhi deciding to keep the baby Kinzo offered her instead of leaving them to their death. Lion's physical appearance is depicted as androgynous which many people especially Willard, their investigation partner, question what Lion's true gender is and Lion insists that it's not important. Bernkastel also has to control everyone around them to hide Lion's gender making them refer to Lion as "Successor-sama". Despite this it is implied that Lion's true gender, and thus Sayo's gender too, is male.

Fantasy world characters

Witches and sorcerers
In the world of Umineko When They Cry, witches are beings who hold powers that allow them to surpass human limitations, and are able to use that power freely. The term "witch" generally refers to females, while males are generally defined as "sorcerers". All witches were either once humans who learned how to use magic, or manifested from human emotions. Humans who can use magic but are unable to use it to its fullest potential are referred to as magicians.

Witches are classified by the types of magic they are able to use. The most recurring type of magic in Umineko is Endless Magic, which grants witches the power to break and repair anything infinitely, including human lives. Witches with this ability, such as Beatrice, are known as Endless Witches and are greatly respected, though they often lose their concept of life and death entirely and are easily corrupted. Even with this power, Endless Witches and all other witches of a lower class are very limited beings, as they are bound to certain territories and unable to use their powers outside of them. Witches who gain the ability to move into other territories called , such as Bernkastel and Lambdadelta, are known as Voyagers, to whom few other witches can compare, though their sense of worth is often deterred, and they are even at the risk of losing their souls on their voyages, which they often hope will be endless. Witches of an even higher order are Creators, beings who hold the ability to create something from nothing. Voyagers are said to become Creators at the ends of their journeys, which they fear for unknown reasons.

She took on the role of an antagonist in order to guide Battler towards the truth of the Rokkenjima Massacre. She is affectionately referred to as  starting in Banquet of the Golden Witch. She first appears in the "Tea Party" of Legend of the Golden Witch, where she confronts Battler over his refusal to accept that his friends and family were killed by magic, and challenges him to a game in which he must prove otherwise from Turn of the Golden Witch onward. A witch who has lived for over a thousand years, she is said to appear as a cloud of golden butterflies, and has the power to summon higher demons among the 72 pillars to serve her. It is said that humans can summon her to have their wishes granted in exchange for compensation, though she often acts whimsically. She is the one rumored to have given Kinzo ten tons of gold and served under him as the alchemic advisor to the Ushiromiya family. There are also rumors of a woman named Beatrice who was kept by Kinzo as a mistress in a hidden mansion on Rokkenjima called Kuwadorian until her death in 1967. In the official manga of Twilight of the Golden Witch, Beatrice was referred to as "Sayo-Beatrice" (reflecting her true identity) to differentiate her from Eva-Beatrice and Ange-Beatrice, as well as from her birth mother Beatrice Ushiromiya and her grandmother Beatrice Castiglioni. She is the witch form of Sayo Yasuda.

Bernkastel is a witch known as the Witch of Miracles, and the true main antagonist of the series. It is said that she resides in a world where concepts such as fate and probability can be visualized. She comes to Beatrice's game to ease her boredom. She assists the player by giving some hints around the workings of the game. Her "Magic of Miracles" allows her to reset a desperate situation as long as the probability of a favorable situation is not equal to zero. She wants to defeat Beatrice, regardless of the means used for this objective. Throughout Umineko When They Cry, she maintains an icy and aloof calm personality in most situations, though by the end of Alliance of the Golden Witch and throughout Umineko no Naku Koro ni Chiru, she is shown to be just as impish and playfully cruel as Lambdadelta, if not more. Bernkastel bears a strong resemblance to Rika Furude from Higurashi When They Cry and is implied to be connected to her. 

Lambdadelta is another witch who fought Bernkastel in a "game" in the past. This is later explained in supplementary tips as her actually aiding Takano from Higurashi, but they do not share any other connection. She is quite childish and holds a grudge against Bernkastel for finally beating her in their last game, although she actually cares for her. She is also known as the "Witch of the Absolute" and was the "Most Powerful Witch in the Universe" before she lost to Bernkastel. She is the most powerful witch next to Bernkastel, and is feared by most other witches, including Beatrice. Her "Magic of Certainty" allows her to kill anyone without fail as an absolute result, which bends the basic rule of magic in Umineko. Like Bernkastel, she is a Voyager. She wishes for Battler and Beatrice to fight against each other for eternity as part of a larger plot to have Bernkastel lose against her. Lambdadelta is strongly implied to be related to Satoko Houjou from Higurashi.

Virgilia was the previous Endless Witch before Beatrice, and was also her teacher. Her new name comes from the Divine Comedy character Virgil, who guides Dante through Hell and Purgatory to Beatrice, who is his guide through Heaven. She is a silver-haired witch with great powers, despite surrendering most of them to Beatrice with the title of the "Endless Witch". She is a dangerous opponent, as she can beat Beatrice in combat if not for a surprise attack. She is also somewhat bumbling as well. She is the witch form of Chiyo Kumasawa and her full name is Publius Virgilia Maro.

Eva-Beatrice is a witch who resides within Eva's heart. She represents all of Eva's dark desires from her childhood, including her greed for the Ushiromiya family inheritance; as such, she has the appearance of Eva as a young girl. She first appears in Banquet of the Golden Witch, where she helps Eva solve the riddle of Beatrice's epitaph, leading to her discovery of Kinzo's hidden gold and her inheritance of the Ushiromiya family. As stipulated in the epitaph, Eva inherits the name "Beatrice" and is granted the titles of Golden and Endless Witch, with Lambdadelta as her guardian. Eva-Beatrice is described by Ange as a "black witch", meaning she manipulates others through anger and hatred. In many ways, she is even crueler than the original Beatrice, using her Endless Magic to "play" with her victims before resurrecting them and killing them again, repeating the cycle until she tires. She is very mocking of others, repeatedly taunting them by saying, .

Ange-Beatrice is the witch form of Ange Ushiromiya, and one of the successors to the name "Beatrice". She inherited the titles of Golden and Endless Witch from Eva on her deathbed in 1998 following the events of Banquet of the Golden Witch and, with Bernkastel's blessing, is the last witch of her time period. By the end of Twilight of the Golden Witch she takes the title of "The Witch of Resurrection".
 

Maria is the witch form of Maria Ushiromiya, having become Beatrice's apprentice after giving a soul to Sakutaro. By succeeding in doing this feat, she is a potential Creator: a witch with an even higher rank than Bernkastel and Lambdadelta, and treated by Beatrice as her equal. Known by the title of "Witch of Origins", she is able to create something from nothing.

Goldsmith is the magician form of Kinzo and is shown to be the main antagonist of Alliance of the Golden Witch.

Erika is the "Witch of Truth", and the witch form of Erika Furudo. At the end of End of the Golden Witch, Erika is named the temporary "Witch of Truth" and Territory Landlord by Bernkastel after her investigation of the murders in the game pins Natsuhi, however, she loses the latter of the two titles to Battler. She is Battler's opponent in End and Dawn of the Golden Witch. Her weapon of choice during debates of red and blue truth is a blue sickle. She manages to take advantage of a logic error in Battler's game in Dawn of the Golden Witch, however, at the climax she is defeated by Beatrice and Battler, and is ultimately erased out of existence, until she returns due to Bernkastel's power.

Battler is the Endless Sorcerer, and the sorcerer form of Battler Ushiromiya. At the end of End of the Golden Witch, Battler is named the "Endless Sorcerer" and "Golden Sorcerer" by Lambdadelta after he inherits Beatrice's power and becomes the new Game Master. In Dawn of the Golden Witch, he grows increasingly obsessed with reviving Beatrice, but proves to be unsuccessful when his efforts produce a much tamer Beatrice, who is childish, naïve and lacks the original's memories. He attempts to demonstrate his understanding of the game in Dawn of the Golden Witch, but ends up inadvertently producing a logic error Erika takes advantage of, and forfeits himself to her entirely.

Featherine is "The Witch of Theatergoing, Drama and Spectating ". She is said to have been the Game Master for countless other games in the past, though she has long-forgotten them. She possesses a crescent-shaped device which floats around her head, serving as a memory aid which maintains traits such as her name, appearance and personality. She is the master of Bernkastel and the most powerful witch among all, calling herself a creator. Was said to have died due to boredom until she was resurrected thanks to Bernkastel's efforts in Beatrice's gameboard. She is the witch form of Ikuko Hachijo.

Piece is "The Witch of the Pieces" and is the antagonist of Last Note of the Golden Witch, the epilogue of Umineko No Naku Koro Ni. She was sent to Beatrice's gameboard to challenge Battler, Beatrice and Ange with the objective for them is to uncover her human form, by the command of her master, Featherine Augustus Aurora. She has a power similar to Featherine's: she can "erase" people from the story and the minds of everyone else by eating them with her hair as she was "erasing them from the plot", also being capable of taking their place as she pleases. She is the witch form of Battler's mother and Rudolph's first wife, Asumu Ushiromiya.

Furniture
The term  in Umineko is used to refer to characters below humans, those who serve others, similar to that of a servant, except those termed furniture are summoned or created by a magician or witch, and have no will on their own. It is suggested that the real human servants are actually furniture created by Kinzo's hands through magic, and are permitted to bear the One-Winged Eagle on their uniforms (a majority of the real servants were raised in an orphanage owned by Kinzo, and when on duty, they utilize pseudonyms, consisting of the kanji  as a suffix. The number and type of furniture summoned at one time depends on the summoner's skill. The term is also used as a form of dehumanization. In addition to special powers, such as transformation and barriers, most furniture have the ability to conjure a magical ornate blade of light from one of their hands for offensive purposes.

Great Demons
The Great Demons of the 72 Pillars are the highest ranking earls of Hell, based on the 72 Demons from The Lesser Key of Solomon. Unlike normal furniture, demons are not created by witches or sorcerers, but are contracted to do their bidding. Due to their nobility in Hell, the 72 demons are well respected in the society of witches.

Ronove is the 27th highest ranking earl of hell named after the demon of the same name. Ronove serves as Beatrice's (and later, Battler's) butler and head furniture. He often serves black tea and cookies to Beatrice and her guests. Nonchalant, he often bears a mysterious smile that is hard to interpret, even for his master. Even though he is bound by contract with Beatrice, he does not hesitate to state facts to tease her. He utilizes barriers for both offense and defense, generating strong ones to both deflect attacks and launch enemies backwards. He can also use a special barrier that returns damage back to the attacker. He is the demon form of Genji Ronoue.

Gaap is the 33rd highest ranking earl of hell named after the demon of the same name. She is a curly-haired woman who wears a red dress and a hat with a pink bow. Quite flamboyant, Gaap loves to tease people and gives people random nicknames by shortening their names ("Riiche" for Beatrice, "Lia" for Virgilia, etc.). She is one of Beatrice's friends, though she is greatly disliked by Virgilia. In the fury of battle, she uses a combination of these portals and various kicks that stab with her sharp heels, overwhelming her opponent and keeping them from moving.

Zepar is the 16th highest ranking earl of hell, named after the demon of the same name, and is Furfur's twin. Despite having the appearance of a girl with long, light-blue hair and a darkly colored dress, Zepar might be male since Furfur is said to be of a different gender. Zepar appears alongside Furfur when summoned by those who seek romance, and has the power to seduce humans. Zepar can also grant unlimited defensive power and even brief immortality to those who contract them.

Furfur is the 34th highest ranking earl of hell, named after the demon of the same name, and is Zepar's twin. Despite having the appearance of a girl with mid-length, red hair and a brightly colored dress, Furfur might be male since Zepar is said to be of a different gender. Furfur appears in unison with Zepar when summoned, and has the power to cultivate emotions. Furfur can also grant an inexhaustible offensive power to those who contract them.

Flauros is the 64th highest ranking earl of hell, named after the demon of the same name. She has the appearance of a red hair girl in a white bikini with tiger ears. Flauros can change into a tiger to eat her victims and is shown to be the one helping Beatrice killing Kinzo, Eva, Hideyoshi, Rudolph, Kyrie and Rosa in the first twilight of one of her many games.

The Seven Stakes of Purgatory
There are seven of them, named after the corresponding demons of the seven deadly sins, and each one can gain power from said sin. The Stakes of Purgatory are described as being inescapable. Only powerful mages can control the Stakes of Purgatory, but they cannot hurt any who have not committed the sins, or have strong magical resistance. The Stakes can take on a human form and their true form, a powerful stake.

While in human form, they rely on their blades of light for offense, switching to stake form to dodge attacks and get in their opponent's blind spot. As for their stake form, while smaller, they are many times faster and can kill by impalement. They can also bounce off walls and anything blocking their way, able to attack from any angle. However, in human form, they are far from invincible, and can still be injured or even killed if shot by guns. In Turn of the Golden Witch, the Stakes of Purgatory first appeared in human form, taking the shape of young girls, each with a different personality, but all have red irises. They can be distinguished through hair styles and colors. They represent the seven stakes with satanic inscriptions owned by Kinzo.

Representing the fallen angel Lucifer and the corresponding sin of pride, she is the eldest among all the Stakes of Purgatory and acts as their leader. Lucifer is based on the servant . She is extremely insecure, knowing herself to be the most inferior to her sisters, and fears what they would do if they found out. As such, she acts arrogant and conceited to keep her weaknesses from being discovered. Despite that, she takes pleasure in surrendering on her own accord. Lucifer's appearance is a girl with long, straight black hair.

Representing the demon Leviathan and the corresponding sin of envy, she is the second eldest of the Stakes of Purgatory, and the self-fashioned representative of the younger sisters to Lucifer. Leviathan is based on the servant . By nature, she is a jealous, selfish crybaby who will do anything to win. Her otherwise brutal personality allows her to easily pinpoint the weaknesses of others. Unfortunately for her, she is clumsy at everything she does and always comes out last at everything she and her sisters do together. Leviathan's appearance is a girl with wavy, middle-length green hair.

Representing the demon Satan and the corresponding sin of wrath, she is the third eldest of the Stakes of Purgatory, based on the servant . She is easily angered and speaks with scornful inflection, making her the most feared out of the sisters, including by the sisters themselves. Since people are too afraid to talk back at her, she often becomes lonely. She often tries to intentionally anger her sisters so they can be angry with her, but to no avail. Satan's appearance is a girl with short, curly pale hair.

Representing the demon Belphegor and the corresponding sin of sloth, she is the middle child of the Stakes of Purgatory, based on the servant . She is hard-working and sensible, but only so that her master can become a lazy pig and fall all the harder. In terms of her motives, Belphegor can be said to be the most demonic of all her sisters. Her serious nature makes her the most trusted of her sisters, but she is not used to being treated with kindness. Belphegor's appearance is a girl with long dark hair in a ponytail.

Representing the demon Mammon and the corresponding sin of greed, she is the third youngest of the Stakes of Purgatory, based on the servant . She is extremely greedy and, with her ability to act quickly, will do anything to get what she wants, often leading her to start conflicts between her sisters. Unlike the other Stakes, however, she is the most honest emotionally. Mammon's appearance is a girl with long brown hair.

Representing the demon Beelzebub and the corresponding sin of gluttony, she is the second youngest of the Stakes of Purgatory, based on the servant . She is a gourmet, and is willing to use even her own flesh if it is used to make a delicious meal. Due to her connection to food, she is widely known among other enthusiasts. She serves as a calming influence among the sisters. She has a competitive streak with Mammon to see who will get something first. Beelzebub's appearance is a girl with short, curly, blonde hair in two drill pony tails.

Representing the demon Asmodeus and the corresponding sin of lust, she is the youngest of the Stakes of Purgatory, based on the servant . She wants to fall in love, and is willing to sacrifice her life for the sake of it. Due to her young age, she is treated affectionately by everyone, but is not taken seriously among the sisters. This makes her wish all the harder for her knight in shining armor to arrive and help her be accepted as an adult, though such a thing is nothing more than a delusion. Asmodeus' appearance is a girl with long, blonde, straight hair in two pony tails.

Chiester Sister Imperial Guard Corps
The  are bunny-girl weapons who can only be summoned by witches and sorcerers with a substantial amount of summoning skills. They are also called "Siesta" as a result a mistranslation. They attack using bows and arrows of light that fire potent beams of light which kill instantly on impact; the lone exception being Battler due to his invincible anti-magic shield. In End of the Golden Witch it is revealed that whoever is the Game Master is also immune. It is said that there is no escape from the Chiesters' attacks, and they can even locate targets from far parts of the island and retrieve the corpses of whom they have killed; despite this, the Chiesters appear to be far from fearless, being terrified away twice when it appeared that their attacks had been useless against both Beatrice and Battler in Banquet of the Golden Witch. They have red eyes, bunny ears, and elaborate military-styled outfits. They represent four guns owned by Kinzo, as well as four bunny toys owned by Maria.

Chiester 00 is named after the "00 buck" shotgun load. Chiester 00 wears a black uniform and has long blonde hair. She has an eyepatch over her right eye, and her left bunny-ear has a scar. As the leader of the summoned Chiesters, she is very composed and serious in her work, though in general besides her work she is a kind-hearted and gentle. She is also known for going full force in battle, and lost her eye for it. She is in charge of guard and reconnaissance.

Chiester 410 is named after the .410 Winchester shotgun. Chiester 410 wears a blue uniform and has short teal hair. Unlike Chiester 45, 410 has a childish, silly smile on her face most of the time. Her duty is the main sniper using the information from Chiester 45.

Chiester 45 is named after the .45 Winchester rifle. Chiester 45 wears a red uniform and has long pink hair tied in two ponytails. She has a nervous look most of the time and she is also somewhat hesitant. Her duty is battle control, information gathering and data mining, trajectory calculating and sending it to Chiester 410.

Chiester 556 is named after the 5.56×45mm NATO rifle cartridge. Chiester 556 wears a purple uniform and has short black hair. She is said to be dead after having been killed by a "Black Witch". This is suggested to be a metaphor for Rosa ripping apart one of Maria's four bunny toys. She was in charge of firing support and guard. In life, she is said to have been teased by the other Chiesters, but only out of love for her. At the end she was resurrected on the Golden Land thanks to Ange-Beatrice's magic.

Eiserne Jungfrau
 is a clergy introduced in End of the Golden Witch. Its name literally means "Iron Maiden" in German. It is a redemption enforcement agency supervised by the Great Court of Heaven, tasked with carrying out interrogations and executions of those who have committed heresy, particularly witches. It is made up of seven Inquisitors, led by Archbishop Dlanor A. Knox, and several other Assistant Inquisitors. Eiserne Jungfrau boasts a great number of spectacular achievements in witch-hunting, and is extremely well known among other agencies.

Inquisitors are armed with two kinds of weapons: the Red Key and the Blue Key. These weapons do not cause physical damage, but instead attack concepts. The Red Key is used to deny the existence of concepts, particularly the concept of witches, and cannot be blocked, avoided, or stalled. The Blue Key is used to cause concepts to waver and create self-doubt in the intended target, though it can be defended against. The Keys take different shapes depending on the Inquisitors who wield them. In heresy trials, the Eiserne Jungfrauen enforce a set of ten commandments created by Dlanor A. Knox's father known as "Knox's Decalogue".

Dlanor is Chief Inquisitor of Eiserne Jungfrau and a first-class archbishop, popularly known as "Dlanor of the Ten Wedges" and "Death Sentence Dlanor". She is named after Ronald Knox, and even upholds Knox's Decalogue during her debates. She has the appearance of a young girl with lavender hair and yellow eyes, and wears a uniform similar to that of a cleric. She is cold towards witches and takes her duties very seriously. Despite her duties as a witch-hunter, however, she is old friends with Virgilia.

Her main weapons are her Red Key and Blue Key, which take the forms of a longsword and shortsword, respectively. She is only dispatched by the Great Court as a last resort after a case is vigorously inspected. Her father created Knox's Decalogue and was a legendary Inquisitor, but broke his own commandments and was interrogated and executed by Dlanor herself, who stopped aging physically and mentally afterward for mysterious reasons.

Cornelia is an aide in Eiserne Jungfrau, and a third-class priest. She wears a cleric-like uniform and appears as a girl with red eyes and bobbed brown hair decorated with yellow ribbons. She has a strong sense of justice, but despite her cold exterior shared by her comrades, she is quite hot-blooded in nature.

Gertrude is a senior aide in Eiserne Jungfrau, and a first-class priest. She wears a uniform similar to Cornelia's, and appears as a girl with red eyes and long blonde hair. Like her comrades, she appears extremely deadpan when on duty, but is actually a very charitable character well liked by her juniors. She was offered a position as an Inquisitor like Dlanor, but she kindly refused.

SSVD
SSVD is another famous redemption agency supervised by the Great Court of Heaven, formally introduced in Requiem of the Golden Witch. Its name is an abbreviation of mystery fiction writer S. S. Van Dine. Inquisitors from SSVD are generally more rigid and fundamentalistic in their jurisdiction than Eiserne Jungfrau, and their conservative values garner both criticism for being outdated and praise for preserving their original intentions.

Willard is a former first-class archbishop and Chief Inquisitor of SSVD, called  for short. He is named after Willard Wright and enforces Van Dine's Commandments. A young ace inquisitor once feared by witches for his cold and ruthless tactics, he gained the nicknames "Wright of the Twenty Wedges" and "Wizard-Hunting Wright". Over time, however, he grew malcontent with SSVD's brutal standards and resigned from his position. Although he appears gruff and quick to anger, he is genuinely good-hearted and opts to be as lenient as possible during his investigations.

Other Furniture

Sakutaro is a stuffed lion doll handmade by Rosa and given to Maria for her birthday. He became Maria's furniture when she gave him a soul through magic. His name was originally intended to be , but since "Sakura" is traditionally a female name, Maria derived from it and added the male suffix . In reality, Sakutaro is a normal stuffed animal who Maria simply imagines to be alive, viewing him as one of her most beloved friends. His vessel takes the shape of a simple lion cub, while his human form has the appearance of a young boy with blond hair, red eyes, an orange cap with pointed ears, and an oversized yellow jacket; he wears a red muffler given to him by Maria in both of his forms. He is innocent and shy, and often utters the phrase .

He is incredibly popular among the Sisters of Purgatory, who never waste an opportunity to pounce and cuddle him all at once, much to his dismay. As furniture under a witch of Mariage Sorcière, he serves as a non-aggressive diplomat with the ability to produce barriers and negate magical attacks to protect Maria, though his defensive powers pale in comparison to more experienced furniture.

Clair is the original form of Sayo's Beatrice, who is made to match the image of a ghost that haunts Rokkenjima with a pure white dress and contrasting personality.

The Goat Butlers are low-level furniture that serve under Beatrice. They commonly appear as largely built men with goat heads and glowing red eyes, similar to a minotaur; there are also females among them, but they are difficult to distinguish. Although faithful to their master, they are lumbering and simple-minded creatures that often misinterpret orders similar to the manner an animal would than a human, and are inferior to most other furniture. However, they pose more than a threat to average humans with their superhuman strength, extremely high resilience to otherwise lethal blows and wounds (save for a gunshot to the head, their weak point), and taste for human flesh. They are seemingly endless in number, allowing an inexhaustible supply of them to be summoned. Their main weapon is a purple blade of light extending from their hands.

References

External links
Official Umineko When They Cry visual novel character profiles 

Lists of anime and manga characters
Umineko When They Cry